Annette Glenn is an American politician from Michigan. Glenn is a Republican member of the Michigan House of Representatives from District 98.

Early life 
Glenn is a native of Idaho.

Education 
Glenn earned a bachelor's degree in Public Administration from Boise State University in Boise, Idaho. While a student, Glenn was the chairperson of Boise State University College Republicans.

Career 
Glenn started her political career as a staff member for the United States House of Representatives and U.S. Senator Bob Dole's Presidential Campaign.

At age 24, Glenn became the chairperson of Ada County (Boise) Republican Party.

In 2016, while Glenn's husband was receiving chemotherapy treatment, she attended meetings and sat in Michigan House sessions with him.

In August 2018, Glenn won the primary election for Michigan House of Representatives from District 98.
On November 6, 2018, Glenn won the election and became a Republican member of the Michigan House of Representatives from District 98. Glenn defeated Sarah Schulz with 52.03% of the votes.

In November 2020, Glenn won reelection for Michigan House of Representatives from District 98. Glenn defeated Sarah Schultz with 58.68% of the votes.

In February 2021, Glenn announced her candidacy for Michigan Senate from the District 36. This election will take place November 2022.

Personal life 
Glenn's husband is Gary Glenn, a politician. They have five children. Glenn and her family live in Midland, Michigan.

See also 
 2018 Michigan House of Representatives election

References

External links 
 Annette Glenn at gophouse.org
 Annette Glenn at ballotpedia.org

21st-century American politicians
21st-century American women politicians
Living people
Republican Party members of the Michigan House of Representatives
Year of birth missing (living people)
Boise State University alumni
Women state legislators in Michigan